Just Take My Heart is a romantic suspense novel by Mary Higgins Clark and her daughter, Carol.  It was released in print and Audio CD on April 7, 2009.

Critical reception
Terri Schlichenmeyer of the Savannah Morning News said that the "'bad guy' is one of the creepiest, most unsettling killers I've seen in a long time."

References

Novels by Mary Higgins Clark
American thriller novels
American romance novels

2009 American novels
Simon & Schuster books